Mark or Marc Morris may refer to:

Arts and entertainment
 Mark Morris (author) (born 1963), English author
 Mark Morris (choreographer) (born 1956), American dancer and choreographer
 Mark Morris (cinematographer), known for his work on several films by Andy Sidaris, including Do or Die
 Marc Morris (producer) producer, writer
 Mark Morriss (born 1971), English singer-songwriter

Sports
 Mark Morris (footballer, born 1962), English football player and manager
 Mark Morris (footballer, born 1968), English football player for Wrexham
 Mark Morris (ice hockey) (born 1958), American ice hockey coach

Other people
 Marc Morris (historian) (born 1973), historian
 Marc Morris (politician), member of the Georgia House of Representatives
 Mark R. Morris (born 1957), American astrophysicist

Other
 Mark Morris High School, a high school in Longview, Washington

See also
 Marcus Morris Sr. (born 1989), American basketball player
 Marcus Morris (publisher) (1915–1989) English publisher and Anglican priest 
 Markieff Morris (born 1989), American basketball player